Mobarakabad (also Romanized as Mobārakābād; also known as Būzbūtābād and Bazmūtār) is a village in Baranduzchay-ye Jonubi Rural District, in the Central District of Urmia County, West Azerbaijan Province, Iran. At the 2006 census, its population was 544, in 105 families.

References 

Populated places in Urmia County